
Gmina Bulkowo is a rural gmina (administrative district) in Płock County, Masovian Voivodeship, in east-central Poland.

Villages
Gmina Bulkowo contains the villages and settlements of Blichowo, Bulkowo, Bulkowo-Kolonia, Chlebowo, Daniszewo, Dobra, Gniewkowo, Gocłowo, Krubice Stare, Krzykosy, Nadułki, Nowa Słupca, Nowe Krubice, Nowe Łubki, Nowy Podleck, Osiek, Pilichówko, Pilichowo, Rogowo, Słupca, Sochocino-Badurki, Sochocino-Czyżewo, Sochocino-Praga, Stare Łubki, Stary Podleck, Szasty, Włóki, Wołowa and Worowice.

Neighbouring gminas
Gmina Bulkowo is bordered by the gminas of Bodzanów, Dzierzążnia, Mała Wieś, Naruszewo, Radzanowo and Staroźreby.

References
Polish official population figures 2006

Bulkowo
Płock County